Ivanovskoye is a rural locality (a village) in Karinskoye Rural Settlement, Alexandrovsky District, Vladimir Oblast, Russia. The population was 19 as of 2010.

Geography 
The village is located on the Molokcha River, 19 km south-west from Bolshoye Karinskoye, 23 km south-west from Alexandrov.

References 

Rural localities in Alexandrovsky District, Vladimir Oblast